{{DISPLAYTITLE:C14H23NO3}}
The molecular formula C14H23NO3 (molar mass: 253.34 g/mol) may refer to:

 Arnolol
 3C-P
 Buscaline
 EEM (psychedelic)
 EME (psychedelic)
 MEE (psychedelic)
 MPM (psychedelic)
 Trisescaline

Molecular formulas